SM Town Live World Tour IV was the 2014–15 worldwide live concert tour by SM Town. The tour commenced with one show in Seoul and then continued in Tokyo, Shanghai, Hsinchu.

Background 
SM Town is the name for the artists under Korean record label SM Entertainment. Each year the company organizes their artists to come together and perform on a four to six hours long concert that tours around the Asian continent.

Concerts 
The concert in Seoul was attended by at least 35,000 audiences, and the concert featured performances from artists like BoA, Kangta, TVXQ, Super Junior, Girls' Generation, Shinee, f(x), Red Velvet, EXO, TRAX, Zhang Li Yin, as well as 18 trainees from the company's trainee project team SM Rookies.

The concert at the Ajinomoto Stadium in Tokyo, Japan attracted over 120,000 people in 2 days.

The concert in Taiwan took place at the Hsinchu County Stadium in Zhubei City.

Performers

Set list

Tour dates

References

External links
 SM Town Official homepage 

12
2014 concert tours
2015 concert tours
K-pop concerts